Lukáš Kozák (born 29 October 1991) is a Slovak professional ice hockey defenceman who is currently playing for HC Nové Zámky of the Slovak Extraliga.

Career statistics

Regular season and playoffs

International

References

External links
 

1991 births
Living people
HK Dukla Trenčín players
HC Kometa Brno players
MHC Martin players
KHL Medveščak Zagreb players
HK 36 Skalica players
HC Slovan Bratislava players
MsHK Žilina players
HK Poprad players
HC Karlovy Vary players
Slovak ice hockey defencemen
Sportspeople from Martin, Slovakia
HC RT Torax Poruba players
HC Nové Zámky players
Slovak expatriate ice hockey players in the Czech Republic
Expatriate ice hockey players in Croatia
Slovak expatriate sportspeople in Croatia